Vasantrao Balwantrao Chavan is a member of the 13th Maharashtra Legislative Assembly. He represents the Naigaon Assembly Constituency. He belongs to the Indian National Congress (INC). He was an independent Member of Legislative Assembly from Naigaon during the previous term, having joined the INC in September, 2014. In May, 2014 he was appointed to the Legislative Assembly's Public Accounts Committee. he is chairperson of janta highschool and agri college in naigaon.

References

Maharashtra MLAs 2014–2019
Independent politicians in India
People from Nanded district
Marathi politicians
Year of birth missing (living people)
Living people
Indian National Congress politicians from Maharashtra